Rother Ochsen is the oldest tavern in the historic center of Stein am Rhein, Switzerland founded in 1446.

It is considered one of the most beautiful wine cellars in Switzerland and the facade is decorated with paintings.

See also 
List of oldest companies

References

External links 
Location on Google Maps

Restaurants in Switzerland
Hotels in Switzerland
Companies established in the 15th century
15th-century establishments in Europe